Daniel Scherning (born 29 October 1983) is a German retired footballer who played as a forward, and is a manager. He last managed Arminia Bielefeld.

Playing career
He spent the majority of his playing time in Germany, having two spells at Arminia Bielefeld II.

Managerial career
Scherning started his coaching career as an assistant coach under Armin Perrey at Arminia Bielefeld II in January 2010; when the latter stepped down in the summer of 2012, Scherning was announced as his replacement. During his four year stay, he led his team to the championship in the 2013/14 season. Since Bielefeld's professional team was relegated from the 2nd Bundesliga at the same time, the second team was not allowed to be promoted.

In the winter of 2016, Scherning became an assistant coach at SC Paderborn 07 and experienced turbulent times there. Initially relegated in terms of sport, the team only remained third-class in 2017 thanks to the license refusal for TSV 1860 Munich. Two promotions in a row followed under head coach Steffen Baumgart, which brought Paderborn into the Bundesliga in 2019. After a year, the team were relegated.

On 7 June 2021, Scherning returned to management as he was appointed head coach at 3. Liga side VfL Osnabrück, who were freshly relegated from the 2. Bundesliga. After just over a year in charge of Osnabrück, Scherning returned to Arminia Bielefeld; but this time as the head coach of the first team, as he replaced the sacked Ulrich Forte- who departed with the side in the relegation places. In March 2023, he was sacked.

Managerial statistics

References

External links

1983 births
Living people
German footballers
Association football forwards
SC Paderborn 07 players
VfL Osnabrück managers
Arminia Bielefeld managers
2. Bundesliga managers
3. Liga managers